John Bertrand Johnson (October 2, 1887 – November 27, 1970) (né Johan Erik Bertrand) was a Swedish-born American electrical engineer and physicist. He first explained in detail a fundamental source of random interference with information traveling on wires.

Early life

According to Steve Johnson:

"John Bertrand Johnson was a cousin of my father, Dr. John A. Johnson. Bert was born to my grandfather's sister, who never married, in Sweden. Bert had no schooling in Sweden and lived in extreme poverty. My grandfather sent for him as a teenager and he ended up on their farm in far Northwestern North Dakota, U.S. My grandfather sent Bert to school and he finally graduated from high school and went on get his PhD in Physics from Yale.  I was told that he worked with Einstein and went on to be director of Bell Labs ... I met Bert several times, but I was fairly young and most of the family history is lost..I am in the process of trying to piece together more details".

According to the IEEE biography entry in, Johnson was born in the Carl Johan parish of Goteborg, Sweden and christened on October 7, 1887.  His birth certificate only recorded his mother's name (Augusta Mathilda Johansdotter 9b. 1866) and his surname is thus derived from his assumed father Carl Bertrand Johnson. He emigrated to the US in 1904 and attended Yale. Johnson became a US citizen in 1928. In 1919 he married Clara Louisa Conger (d.1961) and in 1961 he married Ruth Marie Severtson Bowden. He had two sons by his first marriage, Bertrand Conger and Alan William. John Bertrand Johnson died aged 83 in Orange, New Jersey, US, on November 27, 1970.

Career
In 1928, while at Bell Telephone Laboratories he published the journal paper "Thermal Agitation of Electricity in Conductors". In electronic systems, thermal noise (now also called Johnson noise) is the noise generated by thermal agitation of electrons in a conductor. Johnson's papers showed a statistical fluctuation of electric charge occur in all electrical conductors, producing random variation of potential between the conductor ends (such as in vacuum tube amplifiers and thermocouples). Thermal noise power, per hertz, is equal throughout the frequency spectrum. Johnson deduced that thermal noise is intrinsic to all resistors and is not a sign of poor design or manufacture, although resistors may also have excess noise.

Field-effect transistor
Johnson was possibly among the first people to make a working field effect transistor, based on Julius Edgar Lilienfeld's US Patent 1,900,018 of 1928.  In sworn testimony to the U.S. patent office in 1949, Johnson reported "...although the modulation index of 11 per cent is not great,...the useful output power is substantial...it is in principle operative as an amplifier".  On the other hand, in an article in 1964 he denied the operability of Lilienfeld's patent, saying "I tried conscientiously to reproduce Lilienfeld’s structure according to his specification and could observe no amplification or even modulation."

See also
 Johnson–Nyquist noise
 Timeline of thermodynamics, statistical mechanics, and random processes

References

External articles and references
 J. B. Johnson, "Thermal Agitation of Electricity in Conductors". The American Physical Society, 1928.
 Federal Standard 1037C and MIL-STD-188

1887 births
1970 deaths
Scientists at Bell Labs
Swedish emigrants to the United States
American electrical engineers